V11 may refer to:
Climate Vulnerable Forum (V11), a group of 11 countries formed in 2009
 V11 Tongwell Street, a road in the Milton Keynes grid road system
 V-11 "Scorpio", a microprocessor chip developed by DEC.
 Fokker V.11, a 1918 German experimental biplane aircraft
 Vultee V-11, a 1930s American attack aircraft
 XV-11 Marvel, a 1960s American experimental aircraft

and also :
 V.11, an ITU-T V-Series Recommendation for balanced electrical circuits for data communication at up to 10 Mbit/s